Kelekçi can refer to:

 Kelekçi, Acıpayam
 Kelekçi, Dicle